Washwood Heath Academy is an all through school located in the Washwood Heath ward of Birmingham, England. Originally known as Washwood Heath Comprehensive School, it opened in September 1967. It was extended in 1996 to make way for the Post-16 centre. The school became a specialist Technology College and was renamed Washwood Heath Technology College.

In 2013 Washwood Heath Technology College was converted into an academy and renamed Washwood Heath Academy.

David Harewood, an ex-pupil, made a documentary about turning a group of Washwood Heath pupils into Shakespearean actors in five days.

Controversy
In 1996, maths teacher Israr Khan interrupted a Christmas carol rehearsal performance, questioning the involvement of Muslim pupils professing to Christian theology in the festive songs.
In 2002, the school became the first in Britain to have its entire governing body sacked under new government powers after an 18-month row over race and religion created internal disagreements amongst staff. The board were replaced by a council team and subsequently received praise from Ofsted.
In 2010, following a General Teaching Council disciplinary hearing, teacher Jasbir Dhillon was suspended for three months for being late for class on 21 occasions. Action was taken after pupils complained about his punctuality.

Alumni
 Terry Cooke, professional footballer
 Stephen Duffy, singer songwriter
 David Harewood, television and film actor
 Lee Hendrie, professional footballer
Stuart Lane, TV and radio script writer
Jason Kavanagh professional footballer
Jason White, professional footballer
Rashid Rauf, alleged Al-Qaeda operative
Carl Saunders, footballer
 Ian Taylor, professional footballer

References

External links 
 Washwood Heath Academy homepage 

Secondary schools in  Birmingham, West Midlands
Academies in Birmingham, West Midlands
Primary schools in Birmingham, West Midlands